Barnsley Borough Police was the police force operating in county borough of Barnsley, England until 1 October 1968.  The force was merged with other forces in 1968 to form the West Yorkshire Constabulary.  The area passed to the South Yorkshire Police in 1974.

Notes

History of Barnsley
Defunct police forces of England